Carol Anne Heimer (born 1951) is Professor of Sociology at Northwestern University. She is known for her research on the sociology of risk and responsibility, and on regulation and ethics.

Career and personal life
She received her B.A. from Reed College and her Ph.D. from the University of Chicago. Her dissertation advisors were Charles Bidwell, Edward Laumann, Paul Hirsch, Donald Levine, and Michael Schudson.

She is married to prominent sociologist Arthur Stinchcombe.

Contributions

Her book with Lisa Staffen on infant care, won the American Sociological Association Theory Section Prize, as well as the ASA Medical Sociology Section's Eliot Friedson Award.  It examined the organization of neonatal intensive care units in United States hospitals.  Heimer's current research examines the delivery of AIDS drugs in clinics in South Africa, Uganda, Thailand and the United States.

References

External links 
Carol Heimer

American sociologists
American women sociologists
Northwestern University faculty
Reed College alumni
University of Chicago alumni
1951 births
Living people
21st-century American women